The 1959 News of the World Snooker Plus Tournament was a professional snooker tournament sponsored by the News of the World. The event was played under the Snooker Plus rules, a variant of snooker with two additional  (orange and purple). The tournament was won by Joe Davis with Fred Davis finishing in second place. It was the eleventh and final News of the World Tournament, which ran from 1949/50 to 1959.

Snooker plus

Snooker plus was a variant of snooker created by Joe Davis in 1959 with two additional , orange (8 points) and purple (10 points). The orange spot was midway between the pink and blue, while the purple spot was midway between the brown and blue. If a frame ended in a tie, the purple was re-spotted on the black spot. The extra colours allowed a maximum break of 210. This variant failed to gain popularity but has appeared in some video games such as the World Snooker Championship series, and Shooterspool.

Format
There were three competitors, Joe Davis, Fred Davis and John Pulman, competing for prize money of £750. Matches were of 25 frames over two days. Each played the other, three times. All matches were played in Burroughes Hall, London.

Results
Joe Davis made the first century break, 108, on the opening day of the tournament.

Joe Davis made sure of victory by beating John Pulman in the penultimate match. Fred Davis lost the last match 13–12 but he had needed to win only 11 frames to finish in second place ahead of Pulman.

Table

The positions were determined firstly by the number of matches won (MW) and, in the event of a tie, the number of frames won (FW).

References

News of the World Snooker Tournament
News of the World Snooker Plus Tournament
News of the World Snooker Plus Tournament
News of the World Tournament
News of the World Snooker Plus Tournament
News of the World Snooker Plus Tournament
Snooker variants